The Japanese Motorcycle Grand Prix (日本グランプリ) is a motorcycling event that is part of the Grand Prix motorcycle racing season.

The main venue who held the races for years was the Suzuka Circuit, until it permanently was replaced by the Mobility Resort Motegi from 2004 onwards after the circuit faced criticism for its short runoff area's and dangerous trackside barriers, causing the death of Japanese rider Daijiro Kato and the injuries of Marco Melandri and Alex Barros at the 2003 Japanese Grand Prix. As a result, Suzuka was faced with making considerable safety alterations to avoid a possible strike by the riders – many of whom believed the 240 hp motorbikes had outgrown the tight circuit. The FIM stated that the modifications would not be completed before 2005 and that, therefore, the 2004 Japanese Grand Prix would be held at Motegi, but Suzuka has not appeared on the calendar since.

The 2020 and 2021 races were cancelled due to the outbreak of COVID-19.

The event is due to take place at the Mobility Resort Motegi until at least 2023.

Official names and sponsors
1963: Grand Prix Race Meeting (no official sponsor)
1987–1989, 2001, 2005, 2010: Grand Prix of Japan (no official sponsor)
1990–1991: Kibun Japanese Grand Prix
1992: Japanese Grand Prix (no official sponsor)
1993: Marlboro GP
1994–2000: Marlboro Grand Prix of Japan
2002–2003: SKYY vodka Grand Prix of Japan
2004: Camel Grand Prix of Japan
2006–2008: A-STYLE Grand Prix of Japan
2009: Polini Grand Prix of Japan
2011: Grand Prix of JAPAN (no official sponsor)
2012–2013: AirAsia Grand Prix of JAPAN
2014–2019, 2022–present: MOTUL Grand Prix of Japan

Formerly used circuits

Winners of the Japanese Motorcycle Grand Prix

Multiple winners (riders)

Multiple winners (manufacturers)

By year
A pink background indicates an event that was not part of the Grand Prix motorcycle racing championship.

Notes

References

External links
 

 
Recurring sporting events established in 1962
1962 establishments in Japan